The 2012–13 Maine Black Bears men's basketball team  represented the University of Maine during the 2012–13 NCAA Division I men's basketball season. The Black Bears, led by ninth year head coach Ted Woodward, played their home games at Alfond Arena and were members of the America East Conference. They finished the season 11–19, 6–10 in American East play to finish sixth place. They lost in the quarterfinals of the American East tournament to Albany.

Roster

Schedule

|-
!colspan=9| Exhibition

|-
!colspan=9| Regular season

|-
!colspan=9|2013 America East tournament

References

Maine
Maine Black Bears men's basketball seasons
Black
Black